Joseph Kim Mitchell (born July 10, 1952) is a Canadian rock musician. He was the lead singer and guitarist for the band Max Webster before going on to a solo career. His 1984 single, "Go for Soda", was his only charted song on the US Billboard Hot 100, reaching number 86. Several other singles such as "Patio Lanterns", "Rock and Roll Duty", and "Rockland Wonderland", reached the top 20 in Canada.

Early life
Mitchell attended St. Clair Secondary School in Sarnia. During the 1970s, Mitchell began playing with local bands in Sarnia. After going through a few name changes with essentially the same band, Mitchell and "Zooom" headed for Toronto, Ontario. Zooom eventually dissolved, with Mitchell travelling to the Greek islands.

Career

1982–2003
On his return to Canada, he formed the band Max Webster with fellow Sarnia native Pye Dubois. Max Webster toured extensively and built a string of hits. Mitchell's solo career began after his departure from Max Webster in 1982, with session work and a succession of solo albums.

A new sound was tested on the club circuit and recorded on his 1982 self-titled mini-album. Songs such as "Chain of Events" featured Mitchell's lead vocal and guitar and Dubois' suburban storytelling, anchored by the visceral drum/bass combination of Paul DeLong and Robert Sinclair Wilson. Peter Fredette added a vocal and guitar counterpoint.

In early 1985, the song "Go for Soda" from the Akimbo Alogo album became an international hit and remains his best known song outside of his native Canada. His most successful Canadian album was the follow-up, 1986's Shakin' Like a Human Being, featuring the hits "Alana Loves Me", "Easy to Tame", and the biggest hit of his career, "Patio Lanterns". His 1989 album, Rockland, achieved critical acclaim and was the highest placing chart album of his career.

In 1992, Mitchell played guitar on the track "Brave and Crazy" from Tom Cochrane's album Mad Mad World. In that same year he also made a cameo appearance (as himself) on the third-season finale of the Canadian sketch program The Kids in the Hall.  In 1995, Mitchell participated in the Kumbaya Festival to raise money for AIDS research.

2004–present
Mitchell entered the radio broadcasting industry, becoming an afternoon drivetime host on Toronto classic rock radio station Q107 (CILQ-FM) from April 2004 until August 2015.

On November 15, 2004, Mitchell was awarded the National Achievement Award by SOCAN at the 2004 SOCAN Awards in Toronto.

In 2006, Mitchell provided a guitar solo on the song "Wind It Up" from the Barenaked Ladies' album Barenaked Ladies Are Me.

Mitchell opened for Def Leppard at the Molson Amphitheatre in Toronto on July 16, 2007. His eighth studio album, Ain't Life Amazing, was released on July 17, 2007.

Mitchell has been on the same live bill with many acts over the course of his solo career including Sammy Hagar, Def Leppard, Aerosmith, and Van Halen.

In January 2016, Mitchell suffered a heart attack, for which he underwent emergency surgery.

On May 21, 2020, Mitchell was inducted into the Canadian Songwriters Hall of Fame, although due to the COVID-19 pandemic in Canada the honour was not formally presented to him until 2021.

On Oct 02, 2021, Mitchell performed a sold-out show at the "Sarnia OktBorderFest" in Point Edward, Ontario, followed by the Barenaked Ladies. It is estimated that over 6,000 people were in attendance over the two-night event. Audience members were required to show proof of full vaccination or results of a COVID-19 test. Organizers arranged for a test provider to be set up outside the concert fences for ticket buyers without full vaccinations.

Discography

Albums

Studio albums

Extended plays

Live albums

Compilation albums

Singles

Guest singles

Juno Awards
Mitchell has been awarded several Juno Awards for his work:
1983 – Most Promising Male Vocalist of the Year
1987 – Album of the Year: Shakin' Like A Human Being
1990 – Male Vocalist of the Year

Television appearances
Mitchell  made a cameo appearance on the show Twitch City.
In 2005, Mitchell played a taxi driver on the sixth episode of the third season of Puppets Who Kill, titled "Buttons and the Paternity Suit".
On the sixth episode of the seventh season of the Canadian sitcom Trailer Park Boys, Ricky (Robb Wells) plays one of Mitchell's songs, "Go For Soda", on 8 track, while exclaiming "Bubbles, while you rock a piss, I'll rock some Mitchell."
Mitchell appeared in a skit on the Canadian show The Kids in the Hall, teaching senior citizens how to tune the electric guitar.
"Go For a Soda" was in Season 2, Episode 5:Buddies, on Miami Vice

Family 
Kim Mitchell has two sons, Josh and Jesse. Jesse works for his father as a drum tech and road manager.

In popular culture 
He was the subject of Rush song, "I Think I'm Going Bald".

See also 
 Max Webster
 Canadian rock
 Music of Canada
 Juno Award

References

External links 
 
 Kim Mitchell – The lovelorn troubadour
 Kim Mitchell Music Summary
 "Kim Mitchell"  The Canadian Encyclopedia

1952 births
Anthem Records artists
Canadian rock guitarists
Canadian rock singers
Canadian male singers
Canadian record producers
Canadian radio personalities
Canadian singer-songwriters
Juno Award for Album of the Year winners
Lead guitarists
Living people
Max Webster members
Musicians from Ontario
People from Sarnia
Juno Award for Artist of the Year winners
Juno Award for Breakthrough Artist of the Year winners
Canadian male guitarists
Bronze Records artists